Jocian Bento dos Anjos, commonly known as Jocian, (born 27 August 1979) is a Brazilian football midfielder who plays for Operário.

Career
Jocian began his professional career with Fluminense Football Club, and later moved abroad to play for Terengganu FA in the 2007–08 Malaysian Super League season.

Jocian signed with Operário for the 2011 Campeonato Mato-Grossense second division season.

References

1979 births
Living people
Brazilian footballers
Brazilian expatriate footballers
Fluminense FC players
Terengganu FC players
Association football midfielders